The Women's 50m Freestyle event at the 2003 Pan American Games took place on August 17, 2003 (Day 16 of the Games).

Medalists

Records

Results

See also
Swimming at the 2004 Summer Olympics – Women's 50 metre freestyle

Notes

References
usaswimming
2003 Pan American Games Results: Day 16, CBC online; retrieved 2009-06-13.
swimmers-world
SwimNews Results

Freestyle, 50m
2003 in women's swimming
Swim